The Jewish Women's Committee to End the Occupation of the West Bank and Gaza (JWCEO) was a Jewish-American women's organization dedicated to opposing the Israeli occupation of the Palestinian territories.

History
JWCEO was founded in New York City in April 1988 by Irena Klepfisz, Clare Kinberg, and Grace Paley. The organization held weekly vigils outside of major Jewish-American organizations and in Jewish neighborhoods in order to demonstrate Jewish-American opposition to the Israeli occupation of the West Bank and Gaza. JWCEO was affiliated with other anti-occupation organizations including the Israel Women's Alliance Against the Occupation and Women in Black. The creation of the organization was encouraged by Lil Moed, a Jewish-American feminist who had helped organize the precursor of the Los Angeles chapter of New Jewish Agenda. JWCEO supported peaceful negotiations between the Israeli state and the Palestinian Liberation Organization to facilitate the two-state solution. Beginning on 25 April 1988, JWCEO held weekly vigils in front of Fifth Avenue offices of the Conference of Presidents of Major American Jewish Organizations. Members of JWCEO included the historians Alice Kessler-Harris and Blanche Wiesen Cook, the writer Esther Broner, and the singer Ronnie Gilbert. According to Claire Kinberg, the group faced "a lot of hostility". Irena Klepfisz has stated that JWCEO was more successful despite being less widely known in comparison to other Jewish feminist groups that had criticized the Israeli occupation, such as Di Vilde Chayes.

References

External links
Jewish Women’s Committee to End the Occupation of the West Bank and Gaza (JWCEO), Rise Up!: A Digital Archive of Feminist Activism
Jewish Women’s Committee To End  the Occupation of the West Bank and Gaza Collected Records, 1988-1993, Swarthmore College

1988 establishments in New York City
Jewish anti-occupation groups
Jewish feminism
Jewish-American political organizations
Jewish organizations based in New York City
Palestinian solidarity movement
Women's organizations based in the United States
Jewish women's organizations